Love and War is a 1967 Australian TV series.

It consists of six plays shot in ABC's Gore Hill studios. All of the self-contained episodes were produced by John Croyston, but not all of them were written by Australian script-writers.

Man of Destiny by George Bernard Shaw
Date 6 September 1967 (Sydney) as part of Wednesday Theatre. Produced by Patrick Barton. It went for 60 minutes.

The play had already been filmed by the ABC in 1963.

Cast
Brian Hannan (Napoleon Bonaparte)
Anne Charleston (the Lady)
Dennis Miller (the Lieutenant)
Stanley Page (the Innkeeper)

Sergeant Musgrave's Dance by John Arden
Date  13 September 1967 (Sydney). It aired as part of Wednesday Theatre and ran for 90 minutes.

Plot
An anti-war fanatic falls victim to anarchy of his own making. In England at the end of the 19th century a small group of soldiers, led by the hardest man in the line", goes to a strike bound mining town in the north of England.

Cast
Wynn Roberts as Sergeant Musgrave
Sean Scully
Richard Meikle
Edward Hepple
Michael Boddy
Don Crosby
Neva Carr Glynn
Alice Fraser

Production
It was shot in Sydney under the direction of John Croyston.

L'Flaherty, VC by George Bernard Shaw
Date 20 September 1967 (Sydney). It aired as part of Wednesday Theatre and went for 70 minutes.

Cast
Edwin Hodgeman
Kerry Maguire
Moray Powell
Audrey Teasdale

The Brass Butterfly by William Golding
Date 27 September 1967. Directed by John Croyston. It went for 90 minutes.

Premise
In Ancient Rome an emperor reflects on his life.

Cast
Peter Collingwood as Emperor
Ron Graham
Sue Condon
Peter Rowley as Maximilus
Mark Albiston as Postumus
Alistair Duncan as scientist
Diana Ferris as Euphresne

Intersection by Michael Boddy
Date 4 October 1967 (Sydney) as part of Wednesday Theatre. Went for 65 minutes.

Plot
A woman leaves a small town where she has a boyfriend and falls for a guitarist.

Cast
Helen Morse
John Gregg
Robert McDarra
Beryl Cheers
Slim De Grey

Reception
The Sydney Morning Herald said "The cast did what they could with it. Director John Croyston did what he could."

Construction by John Croyston
Date 11 October 1967. Director: Storry Walton.

Cast
Ron Graham
Moya O'Sullivan.

Romeo and Juliet by William Shakespeare
See Romeo and Juliet (1967 film)''

References

External links
Love and War at IMDb
 Love and War at AustLit
Full script of Construction at National Archives of Australia

Australian Broadcasting Corporation original programming